Hanggai is a village in Tiemao/Tabusai Township, Tumot Left Banner, Hohhot, Inner Mongolia Autonomous Region, China. Its population is about 1500, mostly Han Chinese, with some Mongol families.

References

Populated places in Inner Mongolia
Villages in China
Tumed Left Banner